Piet Botha is a South African businessman and CEO of Subtropico Ltd. A chartered accountant by training, Botha holds a Doctorate in Commerce from the University of Pretoria.

Biography 

After serving his articles, Botha worked as an accountant at Federale Volksbellegings and as a professor in the Faculty of Commerce at the University of Pretoria. He was a partner at auditing firm Coopers Theron du Toit and a senior general manager at Rand Merchant Bank before serving as CEO of Subtropico Ltd and its subsidiaries.

Education 
After serving his articles, Botha worked as an accountant at Federale Volksbellegings and as a professor in the Faculty of Commerce at the University of Pretoria. He was a partner at auditing firm Coopers Theron du Toit and a senior general manager at Rand Merchant Bank before serving as CEO of Subtropico Ltd and its subsidiaries.

Board memberships 
Among his non-executive directorships, Botha serves as chairman of Constantia Ondernemings Ltd, Nationlink (SA) Ltd, Natsure Holdings, Vleissentraal (Pty) Ltd and the Pretoria Eye Institute. He is the deputy chairperson of the Council of the University of Pretoria.

External links 

1948 births
Living people
University of Pretoria alumni
South African businesspeople
University of South Africa alumni
Academic staff of the University of Pretoria